The Nokia N72 is a smartphone introduced by Nokia on April 25, 2006. It runs on Symbian OS 8.1a (S60 2nd Edition FP2). It is effectively a re-branded Nokia N70 with a reduced feature set. It was released in June 2006.

Features

For an Nseries device its features are quite limited, as it has only a 2 MP camera, and runs on Symbian 8.1a operating system. The N72 is based upon the N70 and is actually a remake of the N70-5 but was redesigned and is targeted at the mass market just like its prior model the N70-5 by the removal of the 3G hardware, making it much cheaper. However, it retains the same edition of the Symbian OS as the N70, as well as a similar set of features.
The Nokia N72 is a feature-rich phone with a 2-megapixel camera, a built-in flash, FM radio, Bluetooth 2.0, digital music player functionality and support for 3D Java games. It also supports Bluetooth 2.0 and USB 2.0 – Pop-Port interface. It is available in two colors namely glossy black and pearl pink.

External memory
The N72 uses Dual-Voltage Reduced Size MMC (RS-DV-MMC) cards which are also marketed as MMCmobile. These cards should not be mistaken as RS-MMC cards, which have only 7 contact pins but with the same size. The user memory for Nokia N72 is expandable up to 4 GB memory.

Specification sheet

References

External links
 

Nokia Nseries
Mobile phones introduced in 2006

de:Nokia Nseries#Nokia N72